Works of Carnage is the fifth album by Brazilian death metal band Krisiun.

Track listing

Credits
 Moyses Kolesne – guitars
 Max Kolesne – drums
 Alex Camargo – bass, vocals
 Andy Classen – producer
Jacek Wiśniewski – cover art

References

Krisiun albums
2003 albums
Century Media Records albums
Albums produced by Andy Classen